Martin Reid may refer to:

Martin Reid (actor) (born 1964), British actor and comedian
Martin Reid (cricketer) (1907–1970), Guyanese cricketer
Marty Reid (born 1953), American television sportscaster

See also
Martin Read (born 1950), British businessman
Martin Reed (born 1978), English footballer